Anna Sofie Herland (10 March 1913 - 7 February 1990) was a Norwegian politician for the Liberal Party.

She served as a deputy representative to the Norwegian Parliament from Sogn og Fjordane during the terms 1958–1961 and 1961–1965.

References

1913 births
1990 deaths
Deputy members of the Storting
Sogn og Fjordane politicians
Liberal Party (Norway) politicians
Women members of the Storting
20th-century Norwegian women politicians
20th-century Norwegian politicians